The Virginia Association of Communication Arts and Sciences (VACAS) is the primary Virginia state organization for scholars and professionals in the communication discipline.

There are five divisions of the association:
Communication Education
Debate and Forensics
Interpersonal and Small Group Communication
Mass Media
Rhetoric and Communication Theory

The association holds an annual conference.  The 2004 conference was in Harrisonburg, Virginia, from October 23 to 24.

External links 

 Official website

Organizations based in Virginia